Age or AGE may refer to:

Time and its effects
 Age, the amount of time someone or something has been alive or has existed
 East Asian age reckoning, an Asian system of marking age starting at 1
 Ageing or aging, the process of becoming older
 Senescence, the gradual deterioration of biological function with age
 Human development (biology)

 Periodization, the process of categorizing the past into discrete named blocks of time
 Ages of Man, the stages of human existence on the Earth according to Greek mythology and its subsequent Roman interpretation
Prehistoric age

Places
 AGE, the IATA airport code for Wangerooge Airfield, in Lower Saxony, Germany

People
 Åge, a given name
 Aage, a given name
 Agenore Incrocci, an Italian screenwriter

Arts, entertainment, and media

Fictional entities
 Ages, worlds in the Myst video game series

Music
 "Age" (song), a song by Jim and Ingrid Croce

Periodicals
 Age (journal), a scientific journal on ageing, now named GeroScience
 The Age, a newspaper in Melbourne, Australia
 The Age, a nineteenth-century American newspaper edited by Melville Fuller
 The New York Age, African-American newspaper from 1887 to 1960

Businesses and organizations
 âge, a Japanese media company
 Agricultural & General Engineers or AGE, a group of engineering companies
  or AGE, the Galician Left Alternative, a political party in Spain
 American Aging Association or AGE, an organization for aging studies
Associated Gas and Electric, a defunct American power company from New York

Languages
 East Angal language (ISO-639: age)
 Esimbi language or Age, a language of the Cameroons

Science and technology

Biology and medicine
 Age (genus), a genus of moth
 Arterial gas embolism or AGE, a blood vessel blockage caused by bubbles of gas
 Advanced glycation end-products or AGEs, proteins or lipids that become glycated as a result of exposure to sugars

Other sciences
 Age (geology)
 Age (model theory), an aspect of mathematical model theory
 Applied general equilibrium or AGE, a model in mathematical economics

Other uses
 Agé, a god of the Fon people of Africa

See also

 AG (disambiguation)
 Ages (disambiguation)
 Age of Aquarius (disambiguation)
 Aging (disambiguation)
 AIG (disambiguation)
 Golden age (disambiguation)
 New Age (disambiguation)